The Northeast Dirt Modified Hall of Fame was established in 1992 to recognize individual achievements in the sport of stock car racing.  It is located at 1 Speedway Dr., Weedsport, New York.

History
The inaugural induction ceremonies were held on April 12, 1992, with 12 drivers and one pioneer driver being selected.  The initial selection committee was composed of Gary Chadwick, Andy Fusco, Gary Rowe, Tom Skibinski, and Gary Spaid, all members of the motorsports media. The ceremonies were followed by a Hall of Fame race at Weedsport Speedway.
In 1993, the first non-driver racing award was added. Named after Area Auto Racing News founder Leonard J. Sammons Jr., the award was established to recognize outstanding contributions to the sport. In subsequent years awards honoring both car owners and mechanics/engineering were presented. In 2002 Gater Racing News announced the addition of an annual Outstanding Woman in Racing Award, and upon Andy Fusco’s untimely death in 2015, the Award for Media Excellence was established in his memory. Periodically, the Jack Burgess Memorial Award is bestowed on an announcer who has made a lasting impact on the sport.

Inductees

1992 to 2010

2011 to present

P= Pioneer Selection

Awards
Burgess=Jack Burgess Memorial Award, Media=Andrew S.Fusco Award for Media Excellence, Mechanic=Mechanic/Engineering, Owner=Gene DeWitt Car Owner, Contributor=Leonard J.Sammons Jr.Award for Outstanding Contribution to Auto Racing, OWR=Outstanding Women in Racing.

1993 to 2001

2002 to 2014

2015 to Present

References

External links
 

Auto racing museums and halls of fame
Automobile museums in New York (state)
Dirt track racing in the United States
Halls of fame in New York (state)
Sports museums in New York (state)